I'm Free (Heaven Helps the Man) is a song recorded by American recording artist Kenny Loggins, composed by Loggins, Dean Pitchford, and produced by Loggins and David Foster. It was released in June 1984 as the second of two singles by Loggins from the film, Footloose. It charted at #22 on the Billboard Hot 100 and #31 on the Canadian Hot 100.

The song was very well received, and is one of the most recognizable songs recorded by Loggins.

Music video
The video, directed by Brian Grant, starts with Loggins's character breaking out of a prison. Once free, the music begins. The scene then shifts to him in a car, hiding from police and looking at a picture of a woman. The scene shifts again to Loggins in an alley, surrounded by a gang and asking them about the woman (played by Virginia Madsen); a helpful Samaritan shows Loggins where the woman is located. Loggins then appears in her bedroom and they escape together. At the same time, the police find out about his breakout; Loggins and his girlfriend walk around the town together, but are spotted outside a cinema. The scene shifts again to them running through a building and onto the roof, surrounded by police. Suddenly the gang from earlier arrives and brawls with the police, while the Samaritan helps the pair escape, before walking into the crowd and disappearing.

In popular culture

"I'm Free" was featured in the Family Guy episode "Stewie Loves Lois" (the season 5 premiere),  and during the end credits of the 1984 film "Footloose" with Kevin Bacon.  It was also featured as part of the playlist of in-game radio station Los Santos Rock Radio in Grand Theft Auto V, with Loggins as the station's DJ.

Personnel
Kenny Loggins – vocals, producer
Steve Wood – acoustic piano
Nathan East – bass
Tris Imboden – drums
Buzz Feiten – guitar
Steve Lukather – guitar solo
David Foster – synthesizer, producer
"The Screamers": Lori Raffa, Laurie Williams, Matt Hayutin, Marc Rubinroit, Megan Howard, Michelle Rodino, Amy Rubinroit, Dylan Leiner, Melissa Larson – background vocals
Humberto Gatica – recording, mixing

Chart performance

References

Kenny Loggins songs
1984 songs
1984 singles
Songs written by Kenny Loggins
Songs written by Dean Pitchford
Song recordings produced by David Foster
Songs from Footloose
Columbia Records singles